Nathan Perry Payne (August 13, 1837 – May 12, 1885) was the mayor of Cleveland, Ohio from 1875 to 1876. He was a Democrat.

Early life
Payne was born in Cleveland, Ohio on August 13, 1837.  He was the oldest son of Mary (née Perry) Payne and Henry B. Payne, a former U.S. Representative and U.S. Senator from Ohio. He attended local schools, and Pierce Academy in Middleborough, Massachusetts. Ill health caused him to return home before entering Brown University.

Career
In 1855, he took charge of McIntosh nurseries, and in 1857 he went to work for a coal dealer as an accountant.  In 1860, he formed Cross, Payne & Co., which eventually became known as Payne, Newton & Co.

At the outbreak of the U.S. Civil War, Payne enlisted in the Cleveland Grays, and towards the end of the War, he reenlisted as one of the "Hundred Day Men" volunteers.

Political career
Payne served two terms on the Cleveland Board of Education and served several times, for a total of six years, on the Cleveland City Council between 1862 and 1872.

In 1875, he was elected Mayor of Cleveland as a Democrat in the strongly Republican city, after serving two terms on the board of education and six years on city council.

Personal life
Payne, like his younger brother Oliver Hazard Payne, never married.  In his later years, he lived with his maternal grandmother, Mrs. Nathan Perry, Jr. (the former Paulina Skinner).

Perry died at his home in Cleveland on May 11, 1885 as "one of the most prominent and popular men in Cleveland."  His funeral was held at his residence, 664 Euclid Avenue, and the service was conducted by Dr. Bolles, the Rector of Trinity Church, and the pallbearers were Amos Townsend, John H. Farley, Gen. James A. Barnett, Jacob Mueller, Charles Otis, L. M. Coe, John Tod, and W. J. McKinnie.  He was buried at Lake View Cemetery.

References

External links

1837 births
1885 deaths
Mayors of Cleveland
Ohio Democrats
Cleveland City Council members
Place of death missing
19th-century American politicians